Amedzofe can refer to the following things:

Amedzofe, Ghana, the settlement south of Hohoe in the Volta Region of Ghana
Amedzofe (history), the origin of humanity in Ewe traditions